Anthony O'Flaherty (1800 – 1866) was an Irish Whig, Independent Irish Party and Repeal Association politician.

O'Flaherty was first elected Repeal Association Member of Parliament (MP) for Galway Borough at the 1847 general election and—elected for the Independent Irish Party in 1852, and the Whigs in April 1857—held the seat until July 1857 when he was unseated due to bribery by his agents.

References

External links
 

1800 births
1866 deaths
Irish Repeal Association MPs
Irish Nationalist politicians
Whig (British political party) MPs for Irish constituencies
Members of the Parliament of the United Kingdom for County Galway constituencies (1801–1922)
UK MPs 1847–1852
UK MPs 1852–1857
UK MPs 1857–1859